Ross Township is one of the fourteen townships of Jefferson County, Ohio, United States.  The 2010 census found 721 people in the township.

Geography
Located in the northwestern part of the county, it borders the following townships:
Brush Creek Township - north
Saline Township - northeast
Knox Township - east
Island Creek Township - southeast corner
Salem Township - south
Springfield Township - west

No municipalities are located in Ross Township.

Name and history
Ross Township was founded in 1812. It was named for James Ross.

Statewide, other Ross Townships are located in Butler and Greene counties.

Government
The township is governed by a three-member board of trustees, who are elected in November of odd-numbered years to a four-year term beginning on the following January 1. Two are elected in the year after the presidential election and one is elected in the year before it. There is also an elected township fiscal officer, who serves a four-year term beginning on April 1 of the year after the election, which is held in November of the year before the presidential election. Vacancies in the fiscal officership or on the board of trustees are filled by the remaining trustees.

References

External links
County website

Townships in Jefferson County, Ohio
Townships in Ohio